Torbjörn Jarle Kornbakk (born 28 May 1965) is a Swedish former wrestler. He won a bronze medal in the welterweight (74 kg) event at the 1992 Summer Olympics. At the 1996 Summer Olympics he came in 10th in the same event. He was a two time European Wrestling Championships gold medalist (1990 and 1997), and at the 1994 World Wrestling Championships won a bronze medal.

References

External links
 

1965 births
Living people
Olympic wrestlers of Sweden
Wrestlers at the 1992 Summer Olympics
Wrestlers at the 1996 Summer Olympics
Swedish male sport wrestlers
Olympic bronze medalists for Sweden
Olympic medalists in wrestling
Medalists at the 1992 Summer Olympics
World Wrestling Championships medalists
European Wrestling Championships medalists
Sportspeople from Gothenburg
20th-century Swedish people